Wihan Victor (born 11 November 1997) is a South African cricketer. He made his first-class debut for Free State in the 2015–16 Sunfoil 3-Day Cup on 25 February 2016.

References

External links
 

1997 births
Living people
South African cricketers
Free State cricketers
Place of birth missing (living people)